Stanoc i Epërm is a village in Vushtrri municipality, Kosovo.

See also 
 Vushtrri
 Stanoc i Poshtëm

Notes

References 

Villages in Vushtrri